The 1999–2000 AC Sparta Prague season was the club's 105th season in existence and the seventh consecutive season in the top flight of Czech football. In addition to the domestic league, AC Sparta Prague participated in this season's editions of the Czech Cup and the UEFA Champions League. The season covered the period from 1 July 1999 to 30 June 2000.

Season summary
Sparta won their fourth straight league title and also managed to reach the second group stage of the Champions League

Squad
Squad at end of season

Transfers

In
 Vladimír Labant - Slavia Prague
 Jan Flachbart - Bohemians 1905
 Milan Fukal - FK Baumit Jablonec
 Roman Lengyel - Dynamo České Budějovice
 Jaromír Blažek - Bohemians 1905
 Pavel Hapal - Sigma Olomouc

Loan in
 René Bolf - Baník Ostrava

Competitions

Overview

Czech First League

League table

Results summary

Results by round

Matches

Czech Cup

UEFA Champions League

First group stage

Second group stage

References

AC Sparta Prague seasons
Sparta Prague
Czech Republic football championship-winning seasons